Queijo prato (literally "plate-shaped cheese"), named after the shape it was originally made by the immigrants, is a Brazilian soft cheese, similar to the Danish cheese danbo. It is one of the most popular Brazilian cheeses.

In the 1920s, Danish immigrants in rural parts of Aiuruoca, Minas Gerais, laid the foundation for the production of queijo prato. Since the production method for queijo prato is essentially the same as for danbo cheese, the differences are attributed to milk characteristics. It is characterized by low salt and lactose content, yellow color and mild flavor.

See also
 List of cheeses

References

Brazilian cheeses